Yuriy Konovalov may refer to:

 Yuriy Konovalov (athlete) (1929–2008), Soviet Olympic athlete in running
 Yuriy Konovalov (footballer) (born 1970), Russian football player
 Yury Konovalov (sailor) (born 1961), Russian Olympic sailor